Steve Newman (December 29, 1953 – October 12, 2012) was an American soccer forward who played professionally in the North American Soccer League and American Soccer League.

He spent two seasons with the Dallas Tornado in the North American Soccer League, but never cracked the first team.  In 1978, he played for the Indianapolis Daredevils of the American Soccer League.  In 1979, he played one game for the Seattle Sounders.  He was the head coach of the Mercer Island High School boys' soccer team where he was the 2005 and 2009 King County 3A/2A Coach of the Year.

Newman died of a heart attack on October 12, 2012.

References

External links
Career stats

1953 births
2012 deaths
American soccer coaches
American soccer players
American Soccer League (1933–1983) players
Cleveland Force (original MISL) players
Dallas Tornado players
Columbus Magic players
Indianapolis Daredevils players
Major Indoor Soccer League (1978–1992) players
North American Soccer League (1968–1984) players
Seattle Sounders (1974–1983) players
Association football forwards